Schatten – Eine nächtliche Halluzination ("Shadows - a Nocturnal Hallucination", known in English as Warning Shadows) is a 1923 German silent film directed and co-written by Arthur Robison, and starring Fritz Kortner and Ruth Weyher. It is considered part of German Expressionism.

Plot
During a dinner given by a wealthy count (Fritz Kortner), his beautiful wife (Ruth Weyher) and four of her suitors come together at the 19th-century German manor. A magician (Alexander Granach), referred to as "Shadowplayer" in the cast list, rescues the count's marriage by giving all the guests a vision of what might happen if the count cannot restrain his jealousy and the suitors continue to make advances towards his  wife. The count challenges the man he perceives as his rival (Gustav von Wangenheim) to a duel. The film has a happy ending as violence is averted and the count and his wife save their marriage. But did the events that occurred at the party really happen, or was it all an illusion conjured up by the magician?

Cast
 Alexander Granach as Shadowplayer
 Fritz Kortner as The count
 Ruth Weyher as His wife
 Gustav von Wangenheim as Her lover
 Eugen Rex as A servant
 Lilli Herder as Dienstmaedchen
 Fritz Rasp as Diener
 Karl Platen as 2. Diener
 Max Gülstorff as 2. Kavalier
 Ferdinand von Alten as 3. Kavalier
 Rudolf Klein-Rogge

Production
Troy Howarth writes "The film is fascinating primarily on a visual level. As an exercise in Expressionism, it fully deserves inclusion in the canon of great German horror films", comparing Robison's film to the best of F.W. Murnau and Fritz Lang. He says however that the film runs out of steam toward the end and the characters were too stereotypical to be very interesting. Siegfried Kracauer ranked it among the masterpieces of German cinema, but lamented that it came and went all but unnoticed by the general public.

Director Arthur Robison was born in Chicago, Illinois in 1883, but grew up in Germany where he became an established writer-director in the German silent film industry. His first film was the 1916 German horror film A Night of Horror, and his last film was the 1935 sound remake of The Student of Prague. Actors Von Wagenheim and Granach were reunited again here after both costarred in Nosferatu (1923).

See also 
List of films made in Weimar Germany

Literary significance 
Referred to in Brideshead Revisited by Evelyn Waugh is Anthony Blanche's description of Sebastian's companion Kurt: "He is like the footman in "Warning Shadows" - a great clod of a German..." (presumably the character portrayed by Fritz Rasp).

References

External links
 
 
 
Page of the editor Kino, who released a restored version of the film on DVD in 2006

1923 films
Films of the Weimar Republic
German silent feature films
1923 horror films
German black-and-white films
German Expressionist films
Films directed by Arthur Robison
German horror films
Silent horror films
1920s German films
1920s German-language films